Volodymyr Korotkov (born: 15 October 1966, Born in the USSR) is a sailor. who represented his the Unified Team at the 1992 Summer Olympics in Barcelona, Spain as crew member in the Soling. With helmsman Serhiy Pichuhin and fellow crew member Serhiy Khaindravav they took the 9th place. Volodymyr with helmsman Serhiy Pichuhin and fellow crew member Serhiy Khaindrava took 7th place during the 1996 Summer Olympics in Savannah, United States in the Soling.

References

Living people
1966 births
Sailors at the 1992 Summer Olympics – Soling
Sailors at the 1996 Summer Olympics – Soling
Sailors at the 2000 Summer Olympics – Soling
Olympic sailors of the Unified Team
Olympic sailors of Ukraine
European Champions Soling
Soling class world champions
Ukrainian male sailors (sport)
Sportspeople from Dnipro